Otar may refer to:

 Otar (name), a Georgian given name
 Otar (village), Zhambyl Region, Kazakhstan
 Otar Military Base, a military installation near the village
 Over-the-air rekeying
 Otar I, Duchy of Aragvi (1660–1666)

See also
 Otari (disambiguation)
 Otaru